The 1924 American Cup was the annual open cup held by the American Football Association.

American Cup Bracket
Home teams listed on top of bracket

(*): replay after tied match

Final

See also
1924 National Challenge Cup
1924 National Amateur Cup

References

Amer
American Cup
Fall River Marksmen